Kuh Zar (also Romanized as Kūh Zar; also known as Golzār, Gulzār, and Kūzar) is a village in Shahid Modarres Rural District, in the Central District of Shushtar County, Khuzestan Province, Iran. At the 2006 census, its population was 71, in 16 families.

References 

Populated places in Shushtar County